Cootharaba is a rural locality in the Shire of Noosa, Queensland, Australia.

Geography 
Lake Cootharaba forms part of the south-eastern boundary of Cootharaba.

A section of Tewantin National Park has been established in the southwest of Cootharaba.

History
It is named after the Aboriginal name for the lake, which referred to the place where wood could be found for making notched or studded clubs.

Cootharaba School opened circa 1875 and closed circa 1891.

Cootharaba Road Provisional School opened on 12 Feb 1894. On 7 June 1899, it became Cootharaba Road State School. It closed in 1965.

Cooroora Provisional School opened on 17 January 1898. On 1 January 1909, it became Cooroora State School. In 1911, it was renamed Kareewa State School. In 1933, it was renamed Boreen Junction State School. It closed in 1947. It was at 24 Cootharaba Road.

Cootharaba Lake State School opened on 23 August 1909. It closed in 1943. It was located on the corner of Lakes Flat Road and Kidleys Road (approx ).

Between 2008 and 2013, Cootharaba and the rest of Shire of Noosa was within the Sunshine Coast Region as a result of a forced amalgamation; however the decision was reversed and Shire of Noosa restored in 2014.

References

Further reading

External links
 University of Queensland: Queensland Places:Cootharaba

Suburbs of Noosa Shire, Queensland
Localities in Queensland